Jaźwina  is a village in the administrative district of Gmina Łagiewniki, within Dzierżoniów County, Lower Silesian Voivodeship, in south-western Poland. 

The village has a population of 700.

References

Villages in Dzierżoniów County